Regional Cooperation for Development (RCD) or Organization for Regional Cooperation and Development (ORCD) was  multi-governmental organization which was originally established on the 21st of July 1964 by Iran, Pakistan and Turkey, regional members of the Central Treaty Organization (CENTO), to allow socio-economic development of the member states. Its headquarter was in Tehran, Iran. In 1979, this organization was dissolved. It was replaced by Economic Cooperation Organization (ECO) in 1985. 
Seven new members were added: Afghanistan, Azerbaijan, Kazakhstan, Kyrgyzstan, Uzbekistan, Tajikistan and Turkmenistan.

Joint stamp issues
From 1965 to 1979, the three nations jointly issued stamps. These depicted personalities: Shah of Iran, Mustafa Kemal Atatürk and Mohammad Ali Jinnah; arts, buildings, World Heritage Sites including Moenjodaro and landscapes including Lake Saiful Muluk, Kaghan Valley, Pakistan.

References

External links
 ECO's website.

Intergovernmental organizations
Iran–Pakistan relations
Pakistan–Turkey relations
Iran–Turkey relations
Organizations established in 1964